Cerithiidae, common name the cerithiids or ceriths, is a large family of medium-sized marine gastropods in the clade Sorbeoconcha.

Distribution 
Ceriths are found worldwide on sandy bottoms, reef flats or coral reef rock covered with sand and algae in the sublittoral zone of warm or temperate waters. Most are found in tropical areas. A few occur along the European coastline and about 30 species in two genera are found along the American coast. A few species occur in estuarine areas of mangrove forests close to the sea. Only a few species of the subfamily Bittiinae are found in deep water.

Diet 
Ceriths are herbivores and detritivores that graze the sea bed.

Description
Their slender shell is elongated with a pointed spire. They vary in size from 3 mm (Bittium alternatum) to 150 mm (Cerithium nodulosum). The smallest shells are found in the subfamily Bittiinae.

The many whorls have radial sculpture with axial ridges and nodules. The aperture shows at its base a vague curve or a distinct siphonal canal. The aperture is closed off by a thin oval brown  operculum that is corneous and paucispiral. The palatal wall of the aperture is somewhat enlarged and often shows a varix.

The taenioglossan radula has seven teeth in each row. The single rachidian tooth is flanked on each side by one rhomboidal lateral tooth and two long, hook-like marginal teeth.

Subfamilies
The following three subfamilies have been recognized in the taxonomy of Bouchet & Rocroi (2005):
 Alabininae Dall, 1927
 Bittiinae Cossmann, 1906
 Cerithiinae Fleming, 1822 - synonyms: Rhinoclavinae Gründel, 1982; Colininae Golikov & Starobogatov, 1987

Bandel (2006) used different classification: Bittiinae on its own family level named Diastomatidae (overview of WoRMS).

Some authors classify Argyropezinae Bandel, 2006 as a synonym of Bittiinae.

Genera
Genera within the family Cerithiidae include:

Alabininae Dall, 1927
 Alabina Dall, 1902 - type genus of the subfamily Alabininae, the type species of the genus Alabina is extinct

Bittiinae Cossmann, 1906

Bandel (2006) recognized a family Bittiidae Cossmann, 1906 [which should then be named Diastomatidae Cossmann, 1894 on the grounds of priority] with five subfamilies Bittiinae Cossmann, 1906 (usually placed in Cerithiidae following Houbrick, 1993), Finellinae Thiele, 1931, Alabininae Dall, 1927, Dialinae Kay, 1979 and Diastomatinae Cossmann, 1894. 
This contradicts Ponder (1994) who grouped Finella with Scaliola A. Adams, 1860 in a separate family Scaliolidae Jousseaume, 1912 [Scaliolidae is nevertheless kept distinct by Bandel (2006: 76) on the basis of having a shell agglutinating sand-grains]. It also contradicts Houbrick (1993) who holds the Bittiinae as a subfamily of the Cerithiidae.

It seems premature to reflect this scheme, which upsets current usage, in the WoRMS classification until shell characters are cross-checked with at least another independent (e.g. molecular) set of characters.

 Argyropeza Melvill & Standen, 1901
 Bittiolum Cossmann, 1906 
 Bittium Gray, 1847 - type genus of the subfamily Bittiinae, synonym: Dahlakia Biggs, 1971
 Cacozeliana Strand, 1928
 Cassiella Gofas, 1987
 Cerithidium Monterosato, 1884 
 Ittibittium Houbrick, 1993
 Limatium Strong & Bouchet, 2018
 Lirobittium 	Bartsch, 1911
 Neostylidium Doweld, 2013
 Pictorium Strong & Bouchet, 2013
 Varicopeza Gründel, 1976
 Zebittium Finlay, 1926

Cerithiinae Fleming, 1822 (synonyms Colininae Golikov & Starobogatov, 1987; Rhinoclavinae Gründel, 1982)
 Cerithioclava Bruguière, 1789
 Cerithium Bruguière, 1789 - type genus of the subfamily Cerithiinae, synonyms: Bayericerithium Petuch, 2001; Contumax Hedley, 1899; Thericium Monterosato, 1890
 Clavocerithium Cossmann, 1920
 Clypeomorus Jousseaume, 1888
 Colina H. Adams & A. Adams, 1854
 Fastigiella Reeve 1848
 Gourmya Bayle, 1884
 Liocerithium Tryon, 1887 
 Pseudovertagus Vignal, 1904
 Rhinoclavis Swainson, 1840 - synonyms: Clava Fabricius, 1823; Ochetoclava Woodring, 1928; Proclava Thiele, 1929; Vertagus Iredale, 1931
 Royella Iredale, 1912

subfamily ?
 †  Bezanconia Bayle in Fischer, 1884

Genera brought into synonymy
 Subfamily Colininae Golikov & Starobogatov, 1987 : synonym of Cerithiinae Fleming, 1822
 Subfamily Rhinoclavinae Gründel, 1982: synonym of Cerithiinae Fleming, 1822
 Subfamily  † Tiaracerithiinae Bouniol, 1981: synonym of Batillariidae Thiele, 1929
 † Elassum Woodring, 1946: synonym of Alabina Dall, 1902
 Stylidium Dall, 1907: synonym of Neostylidium Doweld, 2013
 Cacozelia Iredale, 1924: synonym of Cacozeliana Strand, 1928
 Cerithiolum Tiberi, 1869: synonym of Bittium Gray, 1847
 Clathrofenella Kuroda & Habe, 1954: synonym of Cerithidium Monterosato, 1884
 Dahlakia Biggs, 1971: synonym ofBittium Gray, 1847
 Inobittium Monterosato, 1917: synonym of Bittium Gray, 1847
 Manobittium Monterosato, 1917: synonym of Bittium Gray, 1847
 Rasbittium Gründel, 1976: synonym of Bittium Gray, 1847
 Stylidium Dall, 1907: synonym of Neostylidium Doweld, 2013
 Bayericerithium Petuch, 2001: synonym of Cerithium Bruguière, 1789
 Clava Fabricius, 1823: synonym of Rhinoclavis Swainson, 1840
 Contumax Hedley, 1899: synonym of Cerithium Bruguière, 1789
 Drillocerithium Monterosato, 1910: synonym of Cerithium Bruguière, 1789
 Gladiocerithium Monterosato, 1910: synonym of Cerithium Bruguière, 1789
 Gourmierium Jousseaume, 1894: synonym of Cerithium Bruguière, 1789
 Hirtocerithium Monterosato, 1910: synonym of Cerithium Bruguière, 1789
 Liocerithium Sacco, 1894: synonym of Liocerithium Tryon, 1887
 Lithocerithium Monterosato, 1910: synonym of Cerithium Bruguière, 1789
 Ochetoclava Woodring, 1928: synonym of  Rhinoclavis Swainson, 1840
 Proclava Thiele, 1929: synonym of Rhinoclavis (Proclava) Thiele, 1929 represented as  Rhinoclavis Swainson, 1840
 Vertagus Schumacher, 1817: synonym of  Rhinoclavis Swainson, 1840

References

Houbrick R. S. (1978). The family Cerithiidae in the Indo-Pacific. Part 1. The genera Rhinoclavis, Pseudovertagus and Clavocerithium. Monographs of Marine Mollusca 1: 1–130.
 Houbrick R. S. (1992). Monograph of the genus Cerithium Bruguiere in the Indo-Pacific (Cerithiidae--Prosobranchia). 211 p., Smithsonian Institution Press (Washington, D.C.)], PDF.
Wood, Elvira. The Phylogeny of Certain Cerithidae, Annals of the New York Academy of Sciences, Volume XXIV, New York, May 1910, pp. 1–92, Pl. I-IX.

External links 
 Miocene Gastropods and Biostratigraphy of the Kern River Area, California; United States Geological Survey Professional Paper 642 
 Houbrick, Richard S. "Phylogenetic relationships and generic review of the Bittiinae (Prosobranchia: Cerithioidea)." Malacologia (1993).

 
Articles containing video clips